The Syngnathiformes  are an order of ray-finned fishes that includes the trumpetfishes and seahorses.

These fishes have elongated, narrow, bodies surrounded by a series of bony rings, and small, tubular mouths. The shape of their mouth—in at least syngnathids—allows for the ingestion of prey at close range via suction. Several groups of Syngnathiformes live among seaweed and swim with their bodies aligned vertically, to blend in with the stems.
The most defining characteristic of this order is their reverse sexual system. In this order, males conduct in specialized brooding and rearing of the embryos. The males house eggs in an osmoregulated pouch or adhere eggs to their tail until the eggs reach maturity.

The name Syngnathiformes means "conjoined-jaws". It is derived from Ancient Greek syn (συν, "together") + gnathos (γνάθος, "jaw"). The ending for fish orders "-formes" is derived from Latin and indicates "of similar form".

Systematics and taxonomy 
In some models, these fishes are placed as the suborder Syngnathoidei of the order Gasterosteiformes together with the sticklebacks and their relatives. Better supported by the evidence now available is the traditional belief that they are better considered separate orders, and indeed among the Acanthopterygii, they might not be particularly close relatives at all.

In addition, the Pegasidae (dragonfishes and sea moths) are variously placed with the pipefish or the stickleback lineage. While the placement in Syngnathiformes seems to be correct for the latter, the former is possibly an actinopterygian order of its own.  Following the convention of the major fish classification organizations (Fish Base, ITIS, Encyclopedia of Life), the Indostomidae are currently placed in the Gasterosteiformes.

Morphological traits uniting the flying gurnards (Dactylopteridae) and the Syngnathiformes have long been noted. Most authors, however, placed them with the Scorpaeniformes. However, DNA sequence data quite consistently support the belief that the latter are paraphyletic with the Gasterosteiformes sensu lato. As it seems, flying gurnards are particularly close to Aulostomidae and Fistulariidae, and probably should be included with these.

The order as set out in the 5th Edition of Fishes of the World is classified as follows:

 Order Syngnathiformes
 Suborder Syngnathoidei
 Superfamily Pegasoidea
 Family Pegasidae (seamoths)
 Superfamily Syngnathoidea
 Family Solenostomidae (ghost pipefishes)
 Family Syngnathidae (pipefishes and seahorses)
 Subfamily Syngnathinae (pipefishes)
 Subfamily Hippocampinae (seahorses and pygmy pipehorses)
 Suborder Aulostomoidei
 Superfamily Aulostomoidea
 Family Aulostomidae (trumpetfishes)
 Family Fistularidae (cornetfishes)
 Superfamily Centriscoidea
 Family Macroramphosidae (snipefishes)
 Family Centriscidae (shrimpfishes)
 Family Dactylopteridae (flying gurnards)

Other authorities are of the view that without the inclusion of other taxa within Syngnathiformes then the order is paraphyletic. This wider order consists of a "long snouted" clade and a benthic clade and this classification is:

 Order Syngnathiformes
 "long snouted clade"
 Suborder Syngnathoidei
 Family Solenostomidae (ghost pipefishes)
 Family Syngnathidae (pipefishes and seahorses)
 Family Aulostomidae (trumpetfishes)
 Family Fistularidae (cornetfishes)
 Family Centriscidae (shrimpfishes and snipefishes)
 "Benthic clade"
 Suborder Callionymoidei
 Family Callionymidae (dragonets)
 Family Draconettidae (slope dragonets)
 Suborder Mulloidei
 Family Mullidae (goatfishes)
 Suborder Dactylopteroidei
 Family Dactylopteridae  (flying gurnards)
 Family Pegasidae (seamoths)

In their study Longo et al (2017) found that there were short distances between the groupings on the Syngnathiform phylogenetic tree and this supported a hypothesis that there had been a rapid but ancient radiation in the basal Syngnathiformes.

Fossil record

The earliest known syngnathiform is a species of Macroramphosidae, Gasteroramphosus zuppichini from the late Cretaceous, which is similar in form to Marcroramphosus but which has some characters which are suggestive of a relation to Gasterosteoidei.

References

 Integrated Taxonomic Information System (ITIS) (2004): Syngnathoidei (TSN 166438). Retrieved 2006-APR-08
 
 Nelson, Joseph S. (2006): Fishes of the World. John Wiley & Sons, Inc.

External links 
 Skaphandrus.com Syngnathiformes

 
Ray-finned fish orders